Illang: The Wolf Brigade (also known as Inrang) is a 2018 South Korean science fiction action film directed by Kim Jee-woon and starring Gang Dong-won, Han Hyo-joo, Jung Woo-sung and Kim Mu-yeol. It is a live-action adaptation of the Japanese animated film Jin-Roh: The Wolf Brigade.

The film is set in 2029 where South and North Korea prepare for a unified government after a severe economic depression slams both countries. South Korean police launches a special unit, known as "Illang" (The Wolf Brigade), in response to the rise of an anti-reunification domestic insurgency called "The Sect".

The film was released on July 25, 2018. Distributed by Warner Bros. Korea, the film had cost 19 billion won to produce. It received mixed reviews and under-performed at the domestic box office, selling around 897,000 tickets against its break-even point of six million tickets. The film competed in the San Sebastián International Film Festival for the Golden Shell, becoming the second South Korean film to do so.

Synopsis
In 2024, when "political order in the Korean peninsula is shaken," following territorial disputes between China, Japan, and South Korea. The events prompt Japan to remilitarize, and the U.S. and Russia to ramp up military interests in the area. Fearing the possibility of war, North Korea and South Korea agree to re-unify for the sake of survival, with a five year interim put in place as preparation for the reunification. This generates significant backlash from the region's powers (the U.S, Russia, China, and Japan) who oppose reunification.

Significant tariffs are imposed upon both countries, creating an economic depression for both, and weakening public support for reunification. The unrest generated by the political tension in Asia, economic depression, and opposition to reunification results in a domestic terror group known as "The Sect" to form. The Korean police forces quickly become overwhelmed with the size and violence of protests in the regions, prompting the government to create a new, elite police force called the "Special Unit." The unit is characterized by their futuristic military gear, and respirators containing glowing red lights. A year after the formation of the Special Unit, an incident known as "Bloody Friday" occurs, in which the special unit mistakenly fires upon young girls in a suspected Sect compound. After the event, significant opposition to the Special Unit forces the group to utilize their iconic gas masks, to hide their identity as well as provide use in case of bio-hazardous threats.

Plot
During a large demonstration at Gwanghwamun Square, the sect shows itself by bombing the police. The special unit is able to track the fleeing members to the sewers and hunt down some members there. Soldier Lim Joong-kyung of the Special Forces encounters a girl carrying a bomb and wants to make her give it up. As more soldiers join in, the girl detonates the bomb in her hands. The soldiers survive, but Lim shows shock.

From his friend Han Sang-woo, Lim receives a diary that is said to have belonged to the deceased girl Lee Jae-hee. Since Lim was the last to see the girl alive, Han asks him to give the book to her sister. Lim meets Lee Yun-hee at the Namsan Tower. Yun-hee tells him how her sister joining "The Sect" destroyed her family. She also cannot blame Lim for her death. She says he didn't even shoot her and they were just opponents on different sides. Together they go to the bookstore that Yun-hee owns. Inside, Lim discovers a poster of Little Red Riding Hood. Yun-hee tells him she saw a puppet show of Little Red Riding Hood, but a version without a happy ending. The story ends with the wolf eating Little Red Riding Hood.

When Lim leaves, Han from State Security seeks out Yun-hee. He inquires about Lim. Yun-hee is a former member of "The Sect" who is supposed to trap Lim for the State Security. In return, she is promised remission of her prison sentence and an operation for her sick brother. The state security wants to disband the special unit. Meanwhile, the special unit has already gathered evidence that the sect was financed by the State Security and is planning a coup. They are able to arrest the terrorist Gu Mi-kyung, and ask her to track down the leader of the sect so they can have evidence.

Meanwhile, Yun-hee lures Lim into a trap. However, Lim sees through the fact that State Security agents are present. One agent tries to kill Yun-hee, whereupon she joins Lim. Both are able to escape and are instructed by the special forces instructor Jang Jin-tae to go into hiding. However, they can't get there because the soldier who was supposed to take them there was caught and killed by the state security. The new instruction is to go into the sewers together with Yun-hee. Yun-hee turns on the tracking device through which the state security can track them.

In the sewers they meet Jang Jin-tae. He knows about Yun-hee's true identity and has expected that the state security would lead them to her. He then surprises Yun-hee by informing her that Lim is not only a member of the special unit, but belongs to the notorious sub-organization Illang, the Wolf Brigade. Lim is supposed to take out the state security in the sewers. With the help of the Wolf Brigade's battle suit, he manages to kill everyone, including his former friend Han.

Lim is ordered to kill Yun-hee for being a Sect member and spy for the state security. However, he refuses, seeing no need for her death. He stands up to instructor Jang Jin-tae. In the end, everyone remains alive. In the last scene, Yun-hee's brother is seen sitting in a train looking out at a man sitting on a bench. Yun-hee sits down with her brother as the train departs. When she looks out the window, she spots Lim.

Cast
 Gang Dong-won as Im Joong-kyung
 English ver. voiced by Johnny Yong Bosch
 A highly-trained officer/current member of Wolf Brigade who becomes conflicted after witnessing a young girl die before his eyes.
 Han Hyo-joo as Lee Yoon-hee
 English ver. voiced by Desirée Mee Jung
 Supposed elder sister of "the girl in the red cape" who detonated a suicide bomb, and an officer of the Sect with a hospitalized younger brother.
 Jung Woo-sung as Jang Jin-tae
 English ver. voiced by West Liang
 Chief of training camp for Wolf Brigade.
 Kim Mu-yeol as Han Sang-woo
 English ver. voiced by Greg Chun
 Deputy head of the Public Security Department and former member of Wolf Brigade, who left after Bloody Friday.

 Han Ye-ri as Goo Mi-kyung
 English ver. voice by Erika Ishii
 Choi Min-ho as Kim Cheol-jin
 English ver. voiced by Matthew Yang King (credited as Matt King)
 Jang Jin-tae's right-armed man and leader of Wolf Brigade.
 Shin Eun-soo as Lee Jae-hee 
 "The girl in red cape," Lee Yoon-hee's younger sister and Sect's Head Bomb Runner.
 Choi Jin-ho as Chief Presidential Secretary Bak Jeong-gi
 English ver. voiced by Edward Hong
 Ok Ja-yeon
Heo Joon-ho as Lee Gi-Seok
 English ver. voiced by Todd Haberkorn
Park Joo-hee as Hong Jung-hee
Kim Ye-eun as Namsan Tower Cafe's employee
Moon Ye-won as Splendid costume lady
Park Hyung-soo as Barber
Jeon Jin-seo as Kim Yeo-min, Lee Yoon-hee's younger brother

Production
The film was financed by Union Investment Partners, with production being announced in 2013. Filming began on August 16, 2017 in Studio Cube, a South Korean filming complex, and completed on March 23, 2018.

Costumes for the film were designed by Hollywood artist Vanessa Lee, who also worked on the special effects costume for the 2006 film Underworld: Evolution and superhero costumes in the Avengers film series.

Webtoon writer Yoon Tae-ho penned a prequel titled Illang: Prequel, which took place five years before the events of the film. It was developed by Kakao Pages and Daum Webtoon and was released on June 27, 2018, beginning a weekly run of chapters that led up to the film's release on July 25.

Release
Illang: The Wolf Brigade was released in South Korea on July 25, 2018. Netflix acquired the international distribution rights of the film.

The film was selected to compete at the 66th San Sebastián International Film Festival, which was held from September 21–29, 2018. It was Kim Jee-woon's second film to compete at the festival after I Saw the Devil in 2010. Kim and lead actor Gang Dong-won were set to attend the event.

A red carpet and showcase event for the film was held on July 18, 2018 at Times Square Mall in Yeongdeungpo-gu with the attendance of the director and cast.

Reception

Critical response
Mamoru Oshii, the writer of the novel which the film is based on, attended a special screening and commented, "I think this is a powerful movie that provokes lots of thought ... The balance between the realistic locations and the futuristic technologies like iron armor and diverse guns was very impressive."

As per Yonhap review, the film "spent so much time trying to recreate the world from the animated movie and remakes it into a big-scale action blockbuster that it never got the simple things right... the film falls short of properly delivering the intense inner conflict felt by Joong-kyung."

Jason Bechervaise from Screendaily wrote that the film "contains moments of stylistic brilliance through some compelling set-pieces. Yet moving the story from Japan to a Korean peninsula which is on the point of reunifying in 2029 results in a film which is both over-plotted and melodramatic."

Box office
On the first day of its release, the film attracted 274,525 admissions.

The film was made on a  budget and targeted to attract around 6 million moviegoers. However, due to negative reviews from both critics and audience members, the film screened for only three weeks, and ended up attracting a total of 897,254 moviegoers, grossing . The number of South Korean film admissions in July 2018 dropped by 21.4% from 2017, to 5.39 million, due to the sluggishness of this film and the absence of intermediate films to replace it. The number of South Korean film admissions in July 2018 was the lowest since 2008.

Awards and nominations

References

External links
 
 
 
 

Kerberos saga
2018 films
2018 science fiction action films
South Korean remakes of Japanese films
South Korean science fiction action films
2010s Korean-language films
Films about terrorism in Asia
Films set in the future
Films set in 2024
Films set in 2029
Films directed by Kim Jee-woon
Funimation
Dystopian films
2010s South Korean films